Roy Bridges  may refer to:

 Roy D. Bridges Jr. (born 1943), American aviator and astronaut
 Roy Bridges (historian) (1932–2020), British historian of exploration and Africa

See also
Roy Bridge (disambiguation)